CVE may refer to:

 CVE, the ICAO airline designator for Cabo Verde Express
 Canadian Venture Exchange, a stock exchange
 Cape Verdean escudo by ISO 4217 currency code
 Commercial Vehicle Enforcement, another name for Commercial Vehicle Inspection
 Collaborative virtual environment, a computer-simulated method of interaction 
 Common Vulnerabilities and Exposures, a collection of publicly known software vulnerabilities
 CVE, a U.S. Navy designation for escort aircraft carriers
 Countering Violent Extremism Task Force, a U.S. government program
 CVE, the ticker symbol for Cenovus Energy on the Toronto and New York stock exchanges